Decapitatus is a genus of fungus in the family Mycenaceae. The genus, an anamorph of Mycena, is monotypic, containing the single species Decapitatus flavidus.

References

Mycenaceae
Monotypic Agaricales genera